Bandikot is a town and Village Development Committee in Pyuthan, a Middle Hills district of Rapti Zone, western Nepal. Bandikot also refers to a historic fortress. This is the home place of Mr. Pit Bahadur Mahatara, Central Committee Member (CCM) of The Communist Party of Nepal (Maoist-Centre) (Nepali: नेपाल कम्युनिष्ट पार्टी (माओवादी-केन्द्र), or CPN (M-C).

Villages in VDC

References

External links
UN map of VDC boundaries, water features and roads in Pyuthan District

Populated places in Pyuthan District